Lola Montès is a 1955 historical romance film and the last completed film of German-born director Max Ophüls. Based on the novel La vie extraordinaire de Lola Montès by Cécil Saint-Laurent, the film depicts the life of Irish dancer and courtesan Lola Montez (1821–1861), portrayed by Martine Carol, and tells the story of the most famous of her many notorious affairs, those with Franz Liszt and Ludwig I of Bavaria. A co-production between France and West Germany, the dialogue is mostly in French and German, with a few English-language sequences. The most expensive European film produced up to its time, Lola Montès underperformed at the box office. However, it had an important artistic influence on the French New Wave cinema movement and continues to have many distinguished critical admirers. Heavily re-edited (multiple times) and shortened after its initial release for commercial reasons, it has been twice restored (1968, 2008). It was released on DVD and Blu-ray in North America by The Criterion Collection in February 2010.

Plot
In New Orleans, a whip-wielding ringmaster announces to the crowd the “attraction of the century” and “the most interesting predator” of his circus: the former royal mistress Maria Dolorès Porriz y Montez, Countess von Landsfeld, known as Lola Montez. She is carried richly adorned into the circus ring to receive questions from the audience. Each question costs 25 cents, which are not intended as a payment for Lola Montez, as the ringmaster announces, since they will be donated by her to a correctional home for fallen women. The crowd shouts questions to Lola Montez about her waist size and her affairs, but the ringmaster answers them humorously. A parade of lovers begins, where the circus performers represent the number of Lola Montez' lovers. The question of whether the Countess von Landsfeld still remembers them leads Lola Montez to a first flashback of her affair with the composer Franz Liszt.

The affair with Franz Liszt 
Franz Liszt and Lola Montez are on their way to Rome in a carriage, but the composer, who writes pieces for Lola Montez to which she dances in front of an audience, notices that their carriage is followed by another. He reckons to be a mere lover, since Lola Montez will go on board the other carriage as soon as she wants to leave him. Both of them spend the night in an inn and Liszt wants to prevent Lola from leaving. He tears up the just finished farewell waltz and secretly tries to leave the common room, but Lola Montez catches him and they spend one last night together. The next morning they part ways and Lola Montez reads up the torn notes, where Liszt says that she at least remains faithful to his music.

Childhood and youth 
The ringmaster announces a change of scene and costume, as they will now deal with the childhood and youth of Lola Montez. A flashback shows the young Lola boarding a ship to Paris with her mother. While her mother shares a cabin with her lover, Lieutenant James, Lola Montez has to sleep in the dormitory with other girls. Once in Paris, her mother wants her to marry an old baron who was the family's banker. To avoid this fate, she escapes with Lieutenant James, who confesses his love to her, and they get married.

At the beginning of the second act in the circus, the ringmaster claims that the marriage was happy, but a flashback shows that after five years Lola Montez is actually fleeing from her violent, constantly drunk and cheating husband. This is followed by the further life of Lola Montez, depicted in the ring by elaborate tableaux vivants and acted scenes. Lola Montez makes her debut as a dancer in Madrid, is kidnapped by a rich Russian, whose love she rejected, and is freed by the intervention of the French ambassador. During these performances, a doctor talks with the director of the circus, who is still disguised as a clown and counting the daily profits. The doctor warns him that Lola's heart is weak and that she should take care of herself.

Lola tells now her story herself. A short flashback shows how she found out on stage that he was married. She slapped the Kapellmeister while he was conducting the orchestra and then exposed him in front of his wife. At that time, the ringmaster visited her and offered her a contract with the circus, which she refused.

In the circus, while the number of her lovers is read out, ranging from Richard Wagner to Frédéric Chopin, from Count von Lichtenfeld to the Grand Duke of Hesse, Lola Montez swings higher and higher on a trapeze until she stands on the top platform. This is when the flashback of her life in Bavaria begins.

Lola Montez and Ludwig I of Bavaria 
Lola Montez meets a student hiking in the snowy mountains, who is offered a ride in her carriage if he shows her the way to Munich. Here Lola wants to make a career as a dancer, but she is not hired. Shortly before her departure, she begins an affair with Ferdinand von Freiberg, through whom she hopes to get in touch with King Ludwig I. She receives an audience with the king and complains about the lack of opportunities to perform. She clears any doubts about her body by tearing open her bodice in front of Ludwig I ("I have grown very well, do you want to see?"). The king arranges for her to appear as a dancer in the National Theatre, after which she wants to leave. He keeps her at court by commissioning a portrait of her, the completion of which he keeps delaying. She becomes his mistress, but also interferes more and more in politics. During the March Revolution of 1848, the citizens rebel against Lola Montez, who finally flees over the border to Austria at night with the help of the student she met on the way to Munich. She rejects the possibility of a simple life as the student's wife because something has broken in her and she can no longer love.

Finale 
The ringmaster announces that Lola Montez had finally remembered his offer to work together and came to the circus. She has been performing here every day for four months, ending her show by jumping from the top platform onto a padded mat without a net. The doctor asks the ringmaster to keep the net this time, but the ringmaster fears to disappoint the audience and removes the net. The jump shot from Montez' point of view leaves the final outcome open, but at the end she is seen sitting in an animal cage. The male spectators queue in front of the cage to kiss Lola Montez' hand for a dollar. The ringmaster confesses to Lola Montez that he could not exist without her. She replies resignedly: "Life goes on."

Cast
 Martine Carol as Lola Montez
 Peter Ustinov as Circus Master
 Will Quadflieg as Franz Liszt
 Anton Walbrook as Ludwig I, King of Bavaria
 Oskar Werner as Student
 Henri Guisol as Horseman Maurice
 Lise Delamare as Mrs. Craigie, Lola's mother
 Paulette Dubost as Josephine, Lola's maid
 Jacqueline Cantrelle as friend of conductor

Production
Lola Montès was planned as a major project that should put the theory of a European film into practice. Therefore, the film was shot in French, German and English. The German director Max Ophüls was initially critical of the material, but after studying the biography of Lola Montez he began to work on the script for a black and white film.

The production companies expected the film to be a success right from the start and cast it with top-class actors. The French sex symbol of the 1950s Martine Carol was hired in September 1954 and received a fee of around 350,000 marks; Adolf Wohlbrück's fee was 100,000 marks. Since Ophüls wanted the film to revolve around the idea of ​​a circus in which Lola Montez answers questions about her life in front of the audience in the ring, the production and distribution department decided to have the film shot as a colour film. Although the production company had prepared fixed-time contracts with the actors, the start of filming was delayed because Ophüls only consented to a color film after long test shoots. He rewrote the script to consciously use colours in the film.

As CinemaScope films became increasingly popular with the public, the “prestige project” was also planned in the then new recording format. This resulted in further changes to the script, which ultimately also meant high costs for contract extensions for the actors involved, some of whom did not experience a single day of filming during the first contract period. "I started to work two days before the contract was over," wrote leading actor Peter Ustinov looking back.

The first day of shooting took place in mid-February 1955; the shooting locations in the following months were Paris, Nice, Schloss Weißenstein in Pommersfelden, Bamberg and Bavaria Film in Munich. Since in return for a shoot in CinemaScope Ophüls obtained the assurance that "all technical and artistic resources would be made available to him", the cost of the film rose to unprecedented heights at the time. For the ingenious colour concept of the film, paths were artificially coloured; for a shot in which snow was needed, the set was taken to the High Tauern; the scenes of the parade of Ludwig I at the Monopteros in the Englischer Garten were extended from winter to summer and therefore all costumes had to be reworked. For the circus scenes, which represent the frame story and the central theme of the film, a permanent circus building was built, since the building of the Circus Krone in Munich was too low for Max Ophüls' ideas, and the Circus Brumbach was already busy with artists and animals. Each scene was shot in French, German and English, so that production costs and shooting time increased more and more.

Two circumstances saved the film from the premature stop of the shooting due to lack of money: Reinegger, the distributor of Union-Film, had insured the film Lola Montès against exceeding the planned shooting time of 82 days due to force majeure, and had sufficient financial means to have Lola Montès completed thanks to the purchase and subsequent box office success of the Heimatfilm Der Forster vom Silberwald.

At the time of its premiere, Lola Montès had consumed 7.2 million marks, which Ophüls commented in an interview in 1955:“Whatever sum you will hear, don't forget to divide it by three. Because basically we are shooting three films, one German, one English and one French, since all three versions are shot one after the other with the original cast. So each of the three films will cost a sum that by no means can be called unusual."

Release
This was the last film directed by Ophüls before his death of a heart attack in March 1957. As originally shown in France in 1955, the audience sees the events of Lola Montès' life through the use of flashbacks. Use of the technique was criticized upon its release, and the movie did poorly at the box office. In response, the producers re-cut the film and shortened it in favor of a more chronological storyline, against the director's wishes.

According to Roger Ebert, a "savagely butchered version was in circulation for a few years" following Ophüls' death. The film critic Andrew Sarris and others eventually showed improved versions, closer to the original, at the New York Film Festival in 1963 and 1968.

Restoration
Certain elements remained missing and were believed lost, but the later discovery and restoration efforts by Technicolor artists of the lost footage allowed a new version to be edited according to Ophüls' original intentions. The color version of the film with missing footage was digitally restored by a small team of restoration artists including John Healy at Technicolor under the direction of Tom Burton. The black-and-white version of the film was repaired by Martina Müller and Werner Dütsch. The color version including lost footage was shown at the New York Film Festival according to the director's edit version from September 26 to October 12, 2008.

Lola Montès was re-released by Rialto Pictures in November 2008 with the full Cinemascope aspect ratio restored and with five minutes of additional footage never before shown in any U.S. release.

Lola Montès was released on DVD and Blu-ray in North America by The Criterion Collection in February 2010.

Legacy
Roger Ebert lauded the film's camerawork and set design, but felt that Carol's "wooden [and] shallow" performance as the titular character prevented the film from achieving greatness. Nonetheless, it is today among Ophüls' revered works. Dave Kehr called it a masterpiece, and wrote that "certainly this story of a courtesan's life is among the most emotionally plangent, visually ravishing works the cinema has to offer." The film also received five votes in the British Film Institute's 2012 Sight & Sound critics' poll. Lola Montès is acclaimed in Danny Peary's 1981 book Cult Movies as one of the 100 most representative examples of the cult film phenomenon.

References

External links 
 
 
 
 
 Senses of Cinema essay by Rodney Hill
 Loving Lola an essay by Gary Giddins at the Criterion Collection
 LIFE Magazine (May 23, 1969)

1950s biographical drama films
1950s English-language films
1950s French-language films
1950s German-language films
1950s historical drama films
1950s historical romance films
1950s multilingual films
1955 romantic drama films
1955 films
CinemaScope films
Circus films
Cultural depictions of Lola Montez
English-language French films
English-language German films
Films directed by Max Ophüls
Films scored by Georges Auric
Films set in the 19th century
Films shot in Austria
Films shot in Bavaria
Films shot in Nice
French biographical drama films
French historical drama films
French historical romance films
French multilingual films
German biographical drama films
West German films
German historical drama films
German historical romance films
German multilingual films
Romance films based on actual events
Biographical films about entertainers
Films based on French novels
Films based on works by Jacques Laurent
1950s French films
1950s German films